XHDRD-FM is a radio station in Durango, Durango, broadcasting on 104.5 FM with a romantic format known as Vida Romántica.

History

XEDRD-AM 820 received its concession on November 28, 1988. It was owned by Radiorama subsidiary Audio Panorama, S.A.

XEDRD-AM moved to FM in the early 2010s on 106.1 MHz as XHDRD-FM. In 2015, XHDRD flipped from W Radio to Romántica.

XHDRD moved to 104.5 MHz in February 2018 in order to clear 106-108 MHz for community and indigenous radio stations.

References

Radio stations in Durango
Mass media in Durango City